St. Maries Municipal Airport  is a county-owned public use airport located in St. Maries, a city in Benewah County, Idaho. The airport is approximately one mile northwest of downtown St. Maries. It was first opened in April, 1940, and sits on 65 acres of land.

References

Airports in Idaho
Buildings and structures in Benewah County, Idaho
Transportation in Benewah County, Idaho